Andover Town Football Club is a football club based in Andover, Hampshire, England.

History
The club was established by staff from Andover College and Sparsholt College in 2013 after Andover F.C. had disbanded; the two colleges approached Test Valley Borough Council about taking over Andover's Portway Stadium to use for their football academy programmes, with the aim of also forming a senior club. The club were elected to Division One of the Wessex League. During their first season they were involved in a Hampshire Senior Cup tie at Brockenhurst which finished 0–0 after extra time; in the subsequent penalty shootout, 29 consecutive penalties were scored, with Brockenhurst eventually winning 15–14. This was later confirmed by the Football Association as an English record (and possibly a world record) for the highest number of consecutive goals scored in a penalty shootout.

At the end of the 2013–14 season Andover were Division One runners-up, earning promotion to the Premier Division. The following season saw them make their debut in the FA Vase, and in 2015–16 they played in the FA Cup for the first time. In 2017–18 the club were Premier Division runners-up, potentially earning promotion to Division One West of the Southern League. However, the club turned down promotion and were relegated to Division One of the Wessex League as punishment.

Ground

The club took over Andover F.C.'s Portway Stadium following a vote at Test Valley Borough Council in July 2013. The stadium had been built in 1989 at a cost of £850,000. A large stand with bench seating was built on one side of the pitch and slightly raise above it, with the other three sides left open. After being refurbished, the ground was reopened on 28 December 2013 for a match against Team Solent, with Andover winning 4–0 in front of a crowd of 161.

Records
Best FA Cup performance: First qualifying round, 2016–17
Best FA Vase performance: Second round, 2016–17
Record attendance: 546 vs Salisbury, Wessex League Premier Division, 18 August 2015
Biggest win: 11–0 vs East Cowes Victoria Athletic, Wessex League Division One, 25 January 2014
Heaviest defeat: 6–0 vs Salisbury, Wessex League Premier Division, 2 February 2016
Most appearances: Alex Doctree, 130
Most goals: Michael Dixon, 52

See also
Andover Town F.C. players

References

External links
Official website

Football clubs in England
Football clubs in Hampshire
Association football clubs established in 2013
Andover, Hampshire
2013 establishments in England
University and college football clubs in England
Wessex Football League